The Maldives competed at the 2022 Commonwealth Games at Birmingham, England from 28 July to 8 August 2022. It was the team's ninth attendance at the Games, and the first since the country was re-admitted to the Commonwealth of Nations.

Zayan Zaki and Fathimath Nimal were the country's flagbearers during the opening ceremony.

Competitors
The following is the list of number of competitors participating at the Games per sport/discipline.

Athletics

Men
Track and road events

Women
Track and road events

Badminton

As of 1 June 2022, Maldives qualified for the mixed team event via the BWF World Rankings.

Singles

Doubles

Mixed team

Summary

Group stage

Beach volleyball

Maldives was awarded a Bipartite Invitation for the men's tournament.

Men's tournament
Group B

Swimming

Men

Women

Mixed

Table tennis

Maldives qualified a women's team for the table tennis competitions.

Singles

Doubles

Team

References

External links
Maldives Olympic Committee archive

2022
Nations at the 2022 Commonwealth Games
Commonwealth Games